Archyala pentazyga is a species of moth in the family Tineidae. It was described by Edward Meyrick in 1915 using a specimen provided by George Vernon Hudson. Hudson collected the specimen at Days Bay in Wellington in January. It is endemic to New Zealand.

Meyrick described the species as follows:

References

Moths described in 1915
Tineidae
Moths of New Zealand
Endemic fauna of New Zealand
Taxa named by Edward Meyrick
Endemic moths of New Zealand